Orphnophanes turbatalis is a moth in the family Crambidae. It was described by Hugo Theodor Christoph in 1881. It is found in the Russian Far East (Amur).

References

Moths described in 1881
Spilomelinae
Moths of Asia